Jakub Kowalski (born 9 October 1987) is a Polish professional footballer who plays as a right winger for Podhale Nowy Targ.

References

External links
 
 

1987 births
People from Żyrardów
Sportspeople from Masovian Voivodeship
Living people
Polish footballers
Association football midfielders
Concordia Piotrków Trybunalski players
UKS SMS Łódź players
Wigry Suwałki players
OKS Stomil Olsztyn players
Arka Gdynia players
Widzew Łódź players
Okocimski KS Brzesko players
Ruch Chorzów players
Podbeskidzie Bielsko-Biała players
GKS Tychy players
Górnik Łęczna players
Garbarnia Kraków players
Ekstraklasa players
I liga players
II liga players
III liga players